Lysinibacillus alkalisoli is a Gram-positive, aerobic and motile bacterium from the genus of Lysinibacillus which has been isolated from saline-alkaline soil from Hanggin Banner.

References

Bacillaceae
Bacteria described in 2017